Simdega is a city in the Indian state of Jharkhand. Simdega is the administrative headquarters of the eponymous district and Subdivision. Bounded in the north by Gumla, on the east by Ranchi and West Singhbhum, on the west by Jashpur Nagar, Chhattisgarh and on the south by Rourkela, Odisha. The distance between Rourkela and Simdega is 83 km. It is accessible by road through National Highways (National Highway 143) from Rourkela and Ranchi. The nearest railway station is Rourkela railway station.

Historically, the area was ruled by the Gajapati Kings of Gajapati Kingdom of Kalinga for centuries. The region is culturally an amalgamation of indigenous and Odia culture. The influence of Odia culture is significant in the area and the populace. The region also had historical relationship with Emperor Ashoka and Buddhism as evident from archaeological finds in the region.

History
Simdega erstwhile the Kingdom of Kaisalpur-Birugarh Parganas which was ruled by the King Ganga Vamsi of the Gajapati Royal family of the Gajapati Kingdom for centuries even during the British Colonial era. Kesalpur was granted to Raja Hari Deo as a jagir by king Khukhragarh in 16th century. The Gajapati Royal Family still resides at Biru or Birugarh, situated at a distance of about 11 km from Simdega city on NH-23.  This region of plateau is inhabited by the tribal and Odia Communities. The region has always been popular to missionaries, who established schools, convents, hospitals and parishes on the lands donated by the erstwhile Gajapati Kings and its subordinates. Christian Missionaries, especially Society of Jesus, helped in spreading the education by establishing several Christian schools in the region.

As located in South Jharkhand.  Odia culture has highly influenced this region. The Odia Kings ruled this area for centuries even during the period of British Raj. The Gajapati Kings of Kaisalpur-Birugarh invited Odia-Brahmin scholars from Odisha to this region and gradually these Odia Brahmins settled in every corner of the Kaisalpur-Birugarh Kingdom, even today in the remotest villages of this region one can trace these Odia Brahmins families. The Gajapati Kings had donated acres of land and even villages and Zamindaris to them. The schools of this area has produced some eminent hockey players from this area who have represented India in Olympics and other National and International arena. It is known as cradle of Hockey in Jharkhand.

Development of Simdega is crucial to the development of south Jharkhand. Being in the proximity to Rourkela, Industrial Capital of Odisha, the region is bound to develop and cater to population in southern Jharkhand.

Geography

Location

Simdega has an area of 36.20 km2.

Area overview
In the area presented in the map alongside, “the landscape is formed of hills and undulating plateau” in the south-western part of the Chota Nagpur Plateau. About 32% of the district is covered with forests (mark the shaded portions in the map.) It is an overwhelmingly rural area with 92.83% of the population living in the rural areas.  A major portion of the rural population depends on rain-fed agriculture (average annual rainfall: 1,100-1,200 mm) for a living. 

Note: The map alongside presents some of the notable locations in the district. All places marked in the map are linked in the larger full screen map.

Civic administration
Simdega, Muffasil, SC/ST and Mahila police stations are located in Simdega town. 
 
The headquarters of Simdega CD block are located at Simdega town.

Education

Simdega is steadily emerging as a centre for education at the tertiary level. Christian Missionaries have established good schools in the area in land donated by the erstwhile Gajapati kings of Kaisalpur-Birugarh. Both CBSE and JAC curriculum is being followed at schools in Simdega. The Catholic Church remains the largest and prominent contributor in the field of education in the city.

Some of the prominent schools are St.Mary high School, Holy Spirit School, St. John's School, Ursuline Convent for Girls, DAV Public School, Kendriya Vidyalaya, Central academy school and St. Francis School, St. Francis School, Gossner Inter College and Navodaya Vidyalaya.
 
College level education is not adequate for the area as there are only two colleges of Ranchi University, namely Simdega College which being the constituent college of Ranchi University and other affiliated college is S.K. Bage College, Kolebira. St. Xavier's College, Simdega is another Jesuit institution of higher education in the city. There has been constant demand for improving the higher education in the city.

Health

Health services are improving over a period of time. Apart from the community health centers ('CHC') at various Blocks of the district, there are two government hospital at Simdega namely;

 District Hospital 
 Referral Hospital

St. Anne Dispensary and Nursing Home run by the "Daughter of St. Anne" at Church Road, Simdega. Shanti Bhavan Medical Centre a super- specialty Hospital at Biru, Simdega modelled on Christian Medical College & Hospital has been established by Calvary Gospel Ministry, USA. providing the best of medical facilities in collaboration with Christian Medical College & Hospital, Vellore, Tamil Nadu.The Hospital have medical experts from India and abroad.A new medical college and nursing school is also proposed to be opened in the hospital.

Banking and other services

Banking services 
The city has many public sector as well as private sector banks including Canara Bank, State Bank of India, Bank of India, Central Bank of India, Allahabad Bank, Bank of Baroda, Union Bank, UCO Bank, Punjab National Bank,Jharkhand Rajya Gramin Bank, HDFC Bank, ICICI Bank, IDBI Bank and AXIS Bank.

Postal services 
The city has good network of India Post. The Head Post Office is located near Gandhi Maidan, Main Road, Simdega.

Telecom 
The city is served by the state owned telecom company Bharat Sanchar Nigam Limited along with Bharti Airtel, Vodafone India Jio Telenor and Idea Cellular. High speed broadband is available in the city.

Demographics 

According to the 2011 Census of India, Simdega had a total population of 42,944 of which 21,884 (51%) were males and 21,060 (49%) were females. Population in the age range 0-6 years was 5,421. The total number of literate persons in Simdega was 32,067 (85.46% of the population over 6 years. 

(*For language details see Simdega block#Language and religion)

According to the 2001 census, Simdega had a population of 33,962. Males constitute 52% of the population and females 48%. Simdega has an average literacy rate of 68%, higher than the national average of 59.5%: male literacy is 73%, and female literacy is 63%. In Simdega, 15% of the population is under 6 years of age.

Culture and festivals

Christmas is one of the primary festivals in the city as Simdega is primarily a Christian dominated place. The festival is marked with decorating the houses along with Christmas Gathering and Carol Singing at various Churches around the city. The city is marked with various Churches and the festive air makes them more attractive by festive decorations and lights. During the Christmas Eve, the people attend the Midnight Vigil Mass at various churches in the city as well as the rural areas. Simdega is also the seat of Roman Catholic Diocese of Simdega with the Bishop Conducting the celebrations at St. Anne Cathedral in the city.

Nuakhai or Harvest Festival is another major festival which is celebrated by the people in the region along with the sambalpuri people of Western Odisha. It is celebrated during August and September.

The tribes of the region celebrate Sohrai during the date of Diwali festivities, which is celebrated by the Hindu populace of the city and adjoining areas. During the Sohrai festival the Cattle are bathed with water and they are fed with the cakes made of black gram. The people then feast with food and drink, especially rice beer known as Hadia.

Sports 

Simdega is also known as 'Cradle of Hockey' in the state. It have given top notch sportsman at Olympics representing the county.  Sylvanus Dung Dung is former olympian who won Gold at 1980 Moscow Olympics in Hockey. Michael Kindo is another olympian winning Bronze at 1972 summer olympics. Asunta Lakra captain of India's women Hockey Team hails from Simdega.

Recently, the city has got an 'Astroturf Hockey Stadium' for budding Hockey players for the area. It has an outdoor stadium named Albert Ekka Stadium for other sports.

Geography and climate 
It has an average elevation of 418 metres (1371 feet).

Simdega has warm and temperate climate. The rain in Simdega falls mostly in the winter, with relatively little rain in the summer. This climate is considered to be Csa according to the Köppen-Geiger climate classification. The average annual temperature in Simdega is 25.1 °C. In a year, the average rainfall is 1450 mm.The driest month is December, with 3 mm of rainfall. In August, the precipitation reaches its peak, with an average of 410 mm.The warmest month of the year is May, with an average temperature of 33.0 °C. At 17.9 °C on average, December is the coldest month of the year.

Land usage details 
Cultivable land:  1,34,024.33 hectare.
Irrigated      :  16,367 hectare
Un-irrigated   :  1,17,657.33 hect.

Main crops     :  Paddy, Maize, Wheat, Groundnut, Black Gram(Urad).

Main forest produces:  Mahua, Chironji, Kusum seeds, Sal seeds, Tendu leaves

Major industry : Agriculture including Animal Husbandry, Granite Stone Mining, Limestone Mining.

Main Rivers : Sankh River, Chinda River and Palamara River

Economy 
Major part of the economy of Simdega is primarily based on Agriculture and Agriculture allied activities like Shellac production and animal husbandry and Aquaculture. The area has Animal husbandry farms for poultry, Emu, Ducks and pigs. The main crops of Simdega are paddy, corn, and groundnut. The region has fertile soil for cultivation of various fruits and vegetables which are consumed locally through local farmers market, giving emphasis to locally grown and sourced produce.

ATMA ( Agriculture Technology Management Agency) is located in Simdega which gives education and training to local entrepreneurs about latest and scientific agricultural techniques including Animal Husbandry, Lac Production and Honey production.

Simdega's proximity to highly industrialized areas of Odisha provides the area with benefits of being closer to major industrial hubs of Odisha as its economy is dependent upon these industrial hubs in Odisha.

Recently, initiatives have been taken to increase tourism in the area mainly cultural tourism and eco-tourism.

Mineral, Diamond exploration and Power Projects 
 .Geological Survey of India (GSI) has undertaken exploration of Diamonds in Sankh River bed in Simdega. GSI has identified Simdega to have huge and promising Diamond Deposits.De Beers and Jindal Group have identified Simdega for Diamond exploration and mining in Jharkhand and Jindal Steel and Power has obtained a reconnaissance permit to undertake preliminary exploration of precious metals like gold, including stones such as diamonds in Simdega.
 Jindal Power, a subsidiary of JSPL has planned to come up with 2,640 MW power plant in Simdega.
 GSI has also found rich sources of uranium deposits in some areas of Simdega district

Small Hydel Power Projects
Jharkhand Renewal Energy Development Agency (JREDA) has commissioned and erected four Small Hydel Power Projects at Bano, Tethaitangar, Kurdeg and Kolebeira in Simdega to facilitate power generation up to 25MW.

Shellac 

Simdega is a leading producer of Shellac in India which is a highly demanded product in Defence Ammunition and Aviation industry and dyes and paint industry. Majority of the produce is sold to neighbouring states which produce, market and sell the finished product. In spite of being a market leader in Shellac there are no Shellac based industry in Simdega.

Transport 

Simdega is located at the intersection of Jharkhand-Odisha-Chhattisgarh borders.

The city has a Bus Terminal where major routes buses ply from the city to cities in neighbouring states. Ranchi and Simdega are well connected by regular and deluxe Air-Conditioned buses which ply every hour.

By road
Passenger buses and Non Stop buses run regularly from Ranchi, Gumla, Lohardaga, Sasaram Sambhalpur and Rourkela(Odisha).
 Simdega to Ranchi - 155 km
 Simdega to Gumla - 77 km.
 Simdega to Gaya   (Bihar)- 320 km
 Simdega to Sambalpur ( Odisha)- 158 km
 Simdega to Rourkela( Odisha) - 70 km
By air
Rourkela Airport is the nearest Airport. Ranchi Airport  and Jharsuguda Airport are another nearby airports.

By Train 

Rourkela railway station is the nearest railway station. A new proposed railway route from Ranchi to Simdega via Lohardaga and Gumla will pass through the city

Tourist places 
Simdega has potential for development of tourism, and can attract both domestic as well as foreign tourists.

Palkot Wildlife Santury

The Palkot Wildlife Sanctuary falls within the district of Gumla and Simdega. It falls within the Gumla, Simdega and Raidih blocks and the National Highway 23 crosses and divides the sanctuary between two parts. The sanctuary comprises Dry Deciduous Forests (Dry Peninsular Sal) bearing flora like Sal, Asan, Gamhar, Salai, Piar, Amla, Mahua, Kusum, and Mango. The mammal fauna include leopard, sloth bear, jackal, monkey, porcupine, and hare. Birds here include jungle fowl, partridges, koel, parakeet, owl and pheasants. It is located in Deccan Peninsula Biogeography zone, in the Chhotanagpur plateau . Some of the most endangered species like sloth bear, rattle, python, pangolin, black necked crane are represented in the area. It also protects the rivers, streams against siltation by minimizing soil erosion.

Kelaghagh dam 
Kelaghagh dam is a dam on Chhinda river in Simdega. The dam is surrounded by multiple hills which attracts tourists very much.  There facility of boating through motor-boats and para-sailing. Kelaghagh dam also has a guest house for tourist accommodation.

Ram Rekha Dham 
Ramrekha Dham is the most important tourist destination this area. It is situated on top of a hill and every year there is a fair during Kartik Purnima. It is said, that Lord Rama along with Sita and brother Laxman has visited this place and has left his mark (Foot prints) there. Some archaeological structures like agni kund, charan paduka, sita chulha, gupt ganga etc. shows that during Banwas period they followed this path.The Kaisalpur-Birugarh Royal family discovered and developed this place.

Dangadi 
Dangadi is situated in block Bolba. A waterfall attracts the visitors. It is developed as picnic spot. It is 45 km from simdega and 25 km from Kersai.

Ketunga Dham 
Ketunga Dham situated in Bano, Simdega is very important historical place. According to Archaeological survey of India (ASI) the place belonged to Buddha Period.  At Ketunga Dham many statues of Buddha were found. Emperor Ashoka established these statues while returning to Pataliputra after the Kalinga War.

Rajadera 
Rajadera is situated in Thethaitanger, Simdega. There is a waterfall on Chhinda river that is a known picnic spot.

Bhairo Baba Pahari 
Bhairo Baba Pahari is a cave situated in Phulwatanger in Simdega. It attracts visitors as the Cave resembles a human being.

Bhanwar Pahar 
Bhanwar Pahar is in Kolebira. It is known for the presence of Black bees. In ancient age these bees were used by the soldiers. Flowers of Gulaitchi on the small hill is nature's gift to villagers living in the small houses on the hill. A pond exists in between the stones on the hills and is full of water in all seasons.

Mazar of Anjan Peer Saheeb 
The mazar of Anjaam Peer Saheeb is inside the premises of Kolebira police station.  This is a symbol of harmony, social policing and perhaps a single example of a mazar inside a police station. Yearly Urs fair is organised here, and people of all communities participate and pray for peace.

Bandurga 
Bandurga is the holy place of Goddess of Shakti and situated in Bolba Block in Simdega . This place is also a picnic spot.

Arjundoha

Arjundhoda is a picnic spot situated about 15 km from Simdega town .The place consist of rock formations carved out by chhinda river, surrounded by thick vegetation cover this place is of great tourist attractions .

Notable individuals 
 Sylvanus Dung Dung, Former Hockey player and Olympic gold medallist, 1980 Moscow Olympics.
 Michael Kindo, Former Hockey player and Olympic bronze medallist.

References 

Cities and towns in Simdega district
Jharkhand
Tourism in Jharkhand